Moiseyevskaya is a rural locality (a village) in Nizhne-Vazhskoye Rural Settlement, Verkhovazhsky District, Vologda Oblast, Russia. The population was 15 as of 2002.

Geography 
The distance to Verkhovazhye is 4.7 km, to Naumikha is 6.6 km. Rogachikha, Pavlogorskaya, Sergeyevskaya, Afoninskaya, Bolshoye Yefimovo, Pyatino are the nearest rural localities.

References 

Rural localities in Verkhovazhsky District